Bieczyno   is a village in the administrative district of Gmina Trzebiatów, within Gryfice County, West Pomeranian Voivodeship, in north-western Poland. The village has a population of 179.

See also 

 History of Pomerania

References

Bieczyno